Jonantan Villal Ozuna (born January 6, 2005) is a Mexican-American professional soccer player who plays as a midfielder for USL Championship side Atlanta United 2.

Club career
Villal has played with the Atlanta United academy since it began in 2016. He made appearances as an academy player with Atlanta United 2 in the 2021 season, before signing a fully professional contract with the club on January 7, 2022, ahead of the new USL Championship season.

Personal life
Born in the United States, Villal is of Mexican descent.

References

External links
 

2005 births
Living people
American soccer players
Association football midfielders
Atlanta United 2 players
USL Championship players
Soccer players from Georgia (U.S. state)
Sportspeople from Atlanta
American sportspeople of Mexican descent
American sportspeople of Dominican Republic descent
African-American soccer players
Mexico youth international footballers